The 2011 Zucchetti Kos Tennis Cup was a professional tennis tournament played on clay courts. It was the eighth edition of the tournament which is part of the Tretorn SERIE+ of the 2011 ATP Challenger Tour. It took place in Cordenons, Italy between 15 and 21 August 2011.

ATP entrants

Seeds

 1 Rankings are as of August 8, 2011.

Other entrants
The following players received wildcards into the singles main draw:
  Riccardo Bonadio
  Alessandro Giannessi
  Thomas Muster
  Matteo Trevisan

The following players received entry from the qualifying draw:
  Benjamin Balleret
  Niels Desein
  Leonardo Kirche
  Boris Pašanski

Champions

Singles

 Daniel Muñoz de la Nava def.  Nicolás Pastor 6–4, 2–6, 6–2

Doubles

 Julian Knowle /  Michael Kohlmann def.  Colin Ebelthite /  Adam Feeney, 2–6, 7–5, [10–5]

External links
Official Website
ITF Search
ATP official site

Zucchetti Kos Tennis Cup
Clay court tennis tournaments
Internazionali di Tennis del Friuli Venezia Giulia
Zuchetti